The Nausdorf Canal is a canal in the municipalities of Lenzen and Karstädt in the northwest of Brandenburg, Germany. It links two lakes — the Rambower See, in Karstädt, and the Rudower See, in Lenzen — and runs through the Rambower Moor. It takes its name from the village of Nausdorf, part of Lenzen, located midway along the canal.

Already in the 15th century, there was a mill stream that powered a mill in Nausdorf that existed until 1833. The canal was built between 1862 and 1879, and expanded in 1924/1925 to its present dimensions.

The watercourse is not navigable. It is popular with anglers due to its large stock of whitefish.

References

Canals in Germany
Elbe basin
Canals opened in 1879